= Savatagi =

- Village
- Country: India
- State: Karnataka
- District: Belgaum

Languages
  - Official: Kannada
- Time zone: UTC+5:30 (IST)

Savatagi is a village in Kittur Taluq Belgaum district of Karnataka, India. 591104
